Lardi is a surname. Notable people with the surname include:

Federico Lardi (born 1985), Swiss ice hockey defenceman
Kathrin Lardi (born 1942), Swiss athlete
Piero Lardi Ferrari (born 1945), Italian billionaire businessman and sport personality
Theresa Lardi Awuni (born 1979),  Ghanaian politician
Ursina Lardi (born 1970), Swiss actress